Kyle Thompson (born April 25, 1979) is a former American professional golfer.

Professional career
Thompson is a former member of the PGA Tour. He played on the PGA Tour in 2018, 2012 and 2008, failing to keep his card each time. Thompson was a member of the Nationwide Tour from 2003 to 2007. He won two events in 2007 which put him in the top 25 on the money list which earned him a PGA Tour card for 2008. He returned to the Nationwide Tour in 2009 after making nine cuts in 26 events. Thompson again returned to the PGA Tour in 2012, but only made 3 cuts in 22 events. He earned his fourth Web.com Tour win at the 2015 Rex Hospital Open, the third time he won that event. In January 2017, Thompson won his fifth Web.com Tour event at the 2017 The Bahamas Great Exuma Classic.

After a poor 2018 season on the PGA Tour, where he made only 2 cuts in 22 starts, Thompson retired from professional golf and began working as an insurance professional.

Amateur wins
1999 NCAA East Regional
2001 NCAA West Regional
2001 Dogwood Invitational

Professional wins (5)

Web.com Tour wins (5)

Web.com Tour playoff record (2–2)

Results in major championships

CUT = missed the halfway cut
Note: Thompson only played in the U.S. Open.

See also
2007 Nationwide Tour graduates
2011 Nationwide Tour graduates
2017 Web.com Tour Finals graduates
List of golfers with most Web.com Tour wins

References

External links

American male golfers
South Carolina Gamecocks men's golfers
PGA Tour golfers
Korn Ferry Tour graduates
Golfers from Florida
Golfers from South Carolina
People from Panama City, Florida
Sportspeople from Greenville, South Carolina
1979 births
Living people